Jan-Michael Gambill and Travis Parrott were the defending champions, but Gambill did not participate this year.  Parrott partnered Robby Ginepri, losing in the first round.

Bob Bryan and Mike Bryan won in the final 6–3, 7–6(8–6), against Wayne Arthurs and Paul Hanley.

Seeds

Draw

Draw

External links
Draw

Los Angeles Open (tennis)
2004 ATP Tour